You Well-Meaning Brought Me Here is the 1971 album by British folk musician Ralph McTell. The album was produced by Gus Dudgeon, who also produced Elton John's early albums. McTell was now managed by Jo Lustig but still living with his young family in a council flat in Croydon.

Track listing (UK) 
All tracks composed by Ralph McTell

Side One
"Genesis I Verse 20" – 4:28
"First and Last Man" – 3:35
"In Some Way I Loved You" – 2:54
"Lay Your Money Down" – 2:48
"Old Brown Dog" – 4:25
"Pick Up a Gun" – 4:19

Side Two
"You Well-Meaning Brought Me Here" – 3:15
"Chalkdust" – 3:15
"The Ballad of Dancing Doreen" – 3:08
"Claudia" – 3:46
"The Ferryman" – 7:04

Track listing (US) 
All tracks composed by Ralph McTell
"Genesis I Verse 20" – 4:28
"First and Last Man" – 3:35
"In Some Way I Loved You" – 2:54
"Lay Your Money Down" – 2:48
"Old Brown Dog" – 4:25
"Pick Up a Gun" – 4:19
"You Well-Meaning Brought Me Here" – 3:15
"Streets Of London" – 4:30
"The Ballad of Dancing Doreen" – 3:08
"Claudia" – 3:46
"The Ferryman" – 7:04

Charts

Personnel
Ralph McTell – acoustic guitar, piano, Moog synthesizer, harmonica, harmonium, flute, lead vocals
Rick Wakeman – organ, piano
Davey Johnstone – mandolin on "Old Brown Dog"
Johnny Van Derek – violin on "In Some Way I Loved You"
Caleb Quaye – electric guitar
Danny Thompson – double bass
Steve Bonnett – electric bass
Roger Pope – drums
Mike Vickers – Moog synthesizer on "Genesis I Verse 20"
Gus Dudgeon – backing vocals
Sheila Dudgeon – backing vocals
Barry St. John, Christine Holmes, Judith Powell, Liza Strike – backing vocals on "Claudia"
Tony Visconti – arranger, conductor on "The Ballad of Dancing Doreen" and "Claudia"
Robert Kirby – arranger, conductor on "Pick Up a Gun" and "The Ferryman"

Production
Producer: Gus Dudgeon
Recording Engineers: Robin Geoffrey Cable, Alan Harris
Photography: Michael Joseph
Liner notes: Ian Pollock

Release history

References

 

Ralph McTell albums
1971 albums
Albums produced by Gus Dudgeon
Paramount Records (1969) albums
ABC Records albums
Albums recorded at Trident Studios
Albums arranged by Tony Visconti
Albums conducted by Tony Visconti
Albums arranged by Robert Kirby
Albums conducted by Robert Kirby